Carex obscuriceps is a tussock-forming perennial in the family Cyperaceae. It is native to parts of Asia.

See also
 List of Carex species

References

obscuriceps
Plants described in 1909
Taxa named by Georg Kükenthal
Flora of China